Emory George Bauer (February 13, 1913 – October 1, 1989) was an American football, basketball, and baseball coach and college athletics administrator.  He served as the head football coach at Concordia Teachers College—now known as Concordia University Chicago–in River Forest, Illinois from 1941 to 1942 and at Valparaiso University from 1946 to 1967, compiling a career college football record of 115–88–8.  Bauer was also the head basketball coach at Valparaiso for one season in 1947–48, tallying a mark of 8–15, and the school's head baseball coach from 1954 to 1981, amassing a record of 361–243–2.  He was Valparaiso's athletic director from 1970 to 1975.

Head coaching record

College football

References

External links
 

1913 births
1989 deaths
Basketball coaches from Minnesota
Concordia Cougars football coaches
High school football coaches in Illinois
Iowa Pre-Flight Seahawks football coaches
People from Kankakee County, Illinois
Sportspeople from the Chicago metropolitan area
Valparaiso Beacons athletic directors
Valparaiso Beacons baseball coaches
Valparaiso Beacons football coaches
Valparaiso Beacons men's basketball coaches